Joshua Hughson Flint (born 13 October 2000) is an English professional footballer who plays as a defender for Eredivisie club Volendam.

Club career

Portsmouth
Flint joined Portsmouth in 2009 and progressed through the youth age groups. He made his Portsmouth debut on 14 September 2019, starting and scoring in a 3-1 EFL Trophy win over Norwich City U21s. In October 2019, Flint joined Isthmian League side Bognor Regis Town before joining the side on a permanent deal in January 2020 following release by Portsmouth.

Volendam
On 13 September 2020, Flint joined Dutch side FC Volendam, initially joining up with their reserve side in the Tweede Divisie. On 23 November 2020, Flint made his first team debut for Volendam in the Eerste Divisie, coming on as a substitute in a 0-0 draw with Jong Ajax. On 3 October, he scored his first senior goal in a match for the reserve side Jong Volendam in a 3–1 away win over Excelsior Maassluis.

On 16 December 2020, Flint signed a new contract with Volendam, keeping him at the club until 2023.

Career statistics

References

2000 births
Living people
People from Waterlooville
English footballers
Portsmouth F.C. players
Bognor Regis Town F.C. players
Isthmian League players
Tweede Divisie players
Eerste Divisie players
FC Volendam players
English expatriate footballers
Expatriate footballers in the Netherlands
English expatriate sportspeople in the Netherlands
Association football defenders